Westview Secondary is a public high school in Maple Ridge, British Columbia part of School District 42 Maple Ridge-Pitt Meadows. The school opened to the public in 1973 as SD42's only junior high school. But in 1995, the school had a major refit, and its first grade 12 graduates crossed its stage in June 1995.

Presently, Westview Secondary School is the second biggest school in SD42 by size, population, and sports and fitness programs listed.

Sports: Rugby, Basketball, Soccer, Volleyball, & Ultimate Frisbee.

At the beginning of the 2013/2014 school year, Westview lost its principal, Mr. Conner, and vice-principals, Ian Liversidge and McGuaig. The new school year brought in Ms. GieSinger from Thomas Haney Secondary, and Mr. Stanley from Samuel Robertson Technical Secondary.

Westview Secondary has a Multi-Purpose Room (It is the Cafeteria and Theater in both), a weight room, a small, and main gym, a metal-shop, wood-shop, and BCIT auto mechanics shop, 2 Mac computer labs, 1 PC lab, 1 library, 7+ science labs, and 20+ classrooms. The school also features a standard football-field-sized turf field. It is the second-largest in SD42.

High schools in British Columbia
Maple Ridge, British Columbia
Educational institutions established in 1973
1973 establishments in British Columbia